Skeletons is the third studio album by American horror punk musician Wednesday 13. It was released on May 20, 2008, available exclusively through Hot Topic locations in the United States, and in the United Kingdom on by DR2 Records, a subdivision of Demolition Records. It has been described as having a heavier and darker tone than previous efforts. Skeletons was meant to be preceded one month earlier by an EP entitled Bloodwork, however by the release date of Skeletons, Bloodwork had also become available for digital download.

Track listing

Personnel 
Wednesday 13 – vocals, guitars
Nate "H8" Manor – bass
Racci Shay – drums
Jamie Hoover – piano, slide guitars on "All American Massacre"

References 

2008 albums
Wednesday 13 albums